Célio Gabriel de Almeida Venâncio, or simply Célio Gabriel (born 8 February 1986), is a Brazilian footballer who plays as a goalkeeper for Bangu.

External links 
 CBF Profile 

1986 births
Living people
Association football goalkeepers
Brazilian footballers
Brazilian expatriate footballers
Campeonato Brasileiro Série D players
Footballers from São Paulo
Sport Club Corinthians Paulista players
Association football forwards